The National Association of Social Workers (NASW) is a professional organization of social workers in the United States. NASW has about 120,000 members. The NASW provides guidance, research, up to date information, advocacy, and other resources for its members and for social workers in general. Members of the NASW are also able to obtain malpractice insurance, members-only publications, discounts on other products and services, and continuing education.

History 
In 1955, the National Association of Social Workers was established through the consolidation of the following seven organizations:

 American Association of Social Workers
 American Association of Psychiatric Social Workers
 American Association of Group Workers
 Association for the Study of Community Organization
 American Association of Medical Social Workers
 National Association of School Social Workers
 Social Work Research Group

Chapters 
NASW has 55 chapters, which serve their members through the creation of units, branches, regions, or divisions. NASW has chapters in each of the 50 states:

 Alabama
 Alaska
 Arizona
 Arkansas
 California
 Colorado
 Connecticut
 Delaware
 Florida
 Georgia
 Hawaii
 Idaho
 Illinois
 Indiana
 Iowa
 Kansas
 Kentucky
 Louisiana
 Maine
 Maryland
 Massachusetts
 Michigan
 Minnesota
 Mississippi
 Missouri
 Montana
 Nebraska
 Nevada
 New Hampshire
 New Jersey
 New Mexico
 New York
 North Carolina
 North Dakota
 Ohio
 Oklahoma
 Oregon
 Pennsylvania
 Rhode Island
 South Carolina
 South Dakota
 Tennessee
 Texas
 Utah
 Vermont
 Virginia
 Washington
 West Virginia
 Wisconsin
 Wyoming

NASW has additional chapters in New York City, Washington, D.C., Puerto Rico, the United States Virgin Islands, and Guam. Each chapter has a board of directors that develops unique programs to better serve its members and to facilitate participation by its members.

Code of Ethics 
The 1996 NASW Delegate Assembly (revised by the 2017 NASW Delegate Assembly) approved the NASW Code of Ethics (available in English and Spanish), which is intended to serve as a guide to the everyday professional conduct of social workers. This Code includes four sections. The first Section, "Preamble", summarizes the social work profession's mission and core values. The second section, "Purpose of the NASW Code of Ethics", provides an overview of the Code's main functions and a brief guide for dealing with ethical issues or dilemmas in social work practice. The third section, "Ethical Principles", presents broad ethical principles, based on social work's core values, that inform social work practice. The final section, "Ethical Standards", includes specific ethical standards to guide social workers' conduct and to provide a basis for adjudication. Since 2012, the Code of Ethics includes an LGBT non-discrimination policy. The 2018 revision of the Code of Ethics includes 19 changes that address ethical responsibilities when using technology.

National Professional Social Work Month 
NASW introduced National Professional Social Work Month for the first time in March 1963. The original purpose was to encourage public support and interest in social work as a profession. NASW was able to create a buzz around Social Work Month by engaging the public through various television ad campaigns that aired throughout the sixties. This tactic was successful in the early years, generating more than 35,000 letters of support from the public and attracting media coverage of notable social workers in local newspapers.

It was not until 1984 that the White House officially recognized March as National Professional Social Work Month. A joint resolution was introduced by Sen. Daniel Inouye (D-Hawaii) and Rep. Edolphus Towns (D-N.Y) declaring March 1984 as National Social Work Month. This was followed by a lobbying push from NASW chapters and the cosponsorship of Sen. Strom Thurmond (R-S.C). The resolution was passed by the Senate and signed into law by President Ronald Reagan.

NASW Press 
NASW Press is the division of the National Association of Social Workers that publishes books and journals for the social work profession. The NASW Press was formally established in 1990 to advance social work scholarship through the publication of books, journals, and other resources. The NASW Press portfolio includes a monthly newspaper, academic journals, scholarly texts, practice manuals, reference works, pamphlets, brochures, and videos.

In 2010, NASW Press published over 100 scholarly textbooks, peer-reviewed journals, practice manuals, reference works, pamphlets, videos, and brochures in the United States and abroad.

Publications
Social Work Advocates Magazine and NASW NewsBeginning August 2018 Social Work Advocates magazine became NASW's primary means of communicating with membership about association activities and developments in professional practice and social policy. It carries statements of opinion by a variety of spokespersons and, as space permits, letters to the editor. The views expressed do not necessarily represent positions of NASW. The magazine is published bimonthly. It replaced NASW News, which began publishing in 1956 and was the official newspaper of the National Association of Social Workers. Many issues of NASW News are available on an online archives.

Journals Since NASW began publishing its flagship journal, Social Work, in 1955, its portfolio has grown to five journals—including the specialty journals Children & Schools, Health & Social Work, Social Work Research—and Social Work Abstracts.

Social Work Abstracts is a resource for literature searches in social work and social welfare. The president of NASW appoints members to the journal’s advisory group, which establishes policy for the journal.

Reference Works Among NASW Press' reference works, the Encyclopedia of Social Work and The Social Work Dictionary are the most widely distributed titles. In 2010, the encyclopedia and dictionary are respectively in their 20th and 5th editions. NASW policy statements are revised and published every three years in Social Work Speaks, which is now in its 11th edition.

Books As of July 2020, NASW Press has 111 softcover and 56 ebooks in circulation. The NASW Press catalog includes scholarly books/ebooks, practice manuals, brochures for education and training, videos, DVDs, and posters.

See also 
Professional Social Workers' Association
International Federation of Social Workers

References

External links 
 National Association of Social Workers
 National Association of Social Workers Foundation
 Finding aid for the National Association of Social Workers records in the Social Welfare History Archives, University of Minnesota Libraries.

Social work organizations in the United States
Organizations established in 1955
1955 establishments in the United States
Professional associations based in the United States